Mongol Daguur (also referred to as Mongolian Dauria) is a steppe and wetland region in Mongolia listed as a UNESCO World Biosphere Reserve and Ramsar Site of International Importance. A transboundary ecoregion straddling three countries, the area is located in Dornod Province of eastern Mongolia, and is contiguous with the Daurian ecoregion in Russia and the Hulun Lake wetlands in China. The area is categorized as a Strictly Protected Area within the framework of protected areas in Mongolia.

Mongol Daguur's steppe and wetlands territory mainly consists of low mountainous landscapes that support a variety of fauna and flora. The biosphere reserve provides nesting and breeding grounds for globally endangered species such as the white-naped crane, while also serving as a migratory stopover site for many rare and endangered species.

External links
UNESCO.org

References 

Ramsar sites in Mongolia
Biosphere reserves of Mongolia